The Zalău is a right tributary of the river Crasna in northwestern Romania. It flows through the town Zalău. It discharges into the Crasna in Sărmășag.

Hydronymy 

There are several hypotheses which have been made regarding the origin of the river's name (or of the town with the same name located on the upper reach of the river):

 the name is derived from the word "silaj", meaning belt in the language spoken by the Eurasian Avars
 the name is derived from the expression "sil es agz", meaning bed of elm trees in Hungarian
 the name is a Hungarian transcription of the "Zillenmarkt", the German name of Zalău city.

Tributaries

The tributaries of the Zalău are:
left: Valea Miței, Panic, Siciu, Lescuț
right: Guruslău

References

Rivers of Romania
Rivers of Sălaj County